Désiré, Baron Collen (born in Sint-Truiden, Belgium, 21 June 1943) is a Belgian physician, chemist, biotechnology entrepreneur and life science investor. He made several discoveries in thrombosis, haemostasis and vascular biology in many of which serendipity played a significant role. His main achievement has been his role in the development of tissue-type plasminogen activator (t-PA) from a laboratory concept to a life-saving drug for dissolving blood clots causing acute myocardial infarction or acute ischemic stroke. Recombinant t-PA was produced and marketed by Genentech Inc as Activase and by Boehringer Ingelheim GmbH as Actilyse, and is considered biotechnology's first life saving drug.

In 2008 Collen reached the mandatory retirement age of 65 years as Professor of the Faculty of Medicine at KU Leuven (Belgium), where he served as Director of the Center for Thrombosis and Vascular Research (now Center for Molecular and Vascular Biology) and the VIB Department for Transgene Technology and Gene Therapy (now VIB-KU Leuven Center for Cancer Biology). He authored and co-authored over 650 research papers in peer reviewed international journals which have been cited over 70,000 times, and 39 US Patents. He ranked among the 100 most cited scientific authors of the 1980s listed by Current Contents and among the top 100 living contributors to biotechnology in polls conducted by Reed Elsevier in 2005. In 2012 SciTech Strategies placed him among the top 400 most influential scientists in biomedical research for the period 1996–2011.

In 1988, Désiré Collen founded the 'D. Collen Research Foundation vzw', a not-for-profit organization with the mission to invest the mayor part of the royalties earned from Genentech on the t-PA patent in scientific research. The Foundation was renamed in 2007 into 'Life Sciences Research Partners vzw' of which Collen remained the Statutory Chairman until 2019.

In 1991 he spun out the company Thromb-X nv from the KU Leuven in Belgium. The primary focus of Thromb-X was in the cardiovascular space with an initial effort to develop staphylokinase as a more affordable thrombolytic medicine compared to t-PA ("poor man's t-PA"). With the constitution of ThromboGenics Ltd in Ireland in 1998, the company expanded its R&D scope to include cardiovascular, oncology and ophthalmology programs. ThromboGenics developed ocriplasmin, a truncated form of plasmin, for the treatment of vitreomacular traction in the eye. Disappointed by the, in his opinion inadequate strategic and commercial governance of the company, Collen left ThromboGenics as Chairman and board member in December 2013.

With the help of Chris Buyse, his CFO and "companion de route" during their 7 years at ThromboGenics, he co-financed the start of Fund+, an ever-green investment fund that currently manages over 200 million euro . Fund+ is a private Fund for long term equity investment in innovative life sciences companies with a strong patient-centered approach aiming at both a financial return and a tangible societal impact.

King Albert II of Belgium awarded Désiré Collen hereditary nobility, with the personal rank of Baron in 2013. He was also recipient of the Belgian Francqui Prize in 1984, Louis-Jeantet Prize for Medicine in 1986, Bristol-Myers Squibb Award for Cardiovascular Research in 1994, Interbrew-Baillet Latour Health Prize in 2005, Insead Innovator Prize in 2009, Robert P. Grant Medal of the International Society for Thrombosis and Haemostasis in 2011,  Lifetime Achievement Award of the Belgian-American Chamber of Commerce (BelCham) in 2013, and Lifetime Achievement Award of Scrip in 2013. He received honorary doctorates from Erasmus University, Rotterdam, the Netherlands in 1988; Free University of Brussels (VUB), Brussels, Belgium in 1994; University of Notre Dame, Notre Dame, IN, United States in 1995; and Université de la Méditerranée, Marseille, France, in 1999.

Education
Désiré Collen, born on 21 June 1943 in the Flemish town of Sint-Truiden as the first of two children of Frans Collen and Maria Hoebrechs, started his studies in medicine at the University of Leuven (KU Leuven) in 1961. Since his third year of the seven-year curriculum he combined his studies with research: first in the laboratory of Belgian physiologist Joseph P. Bouckaert, and from the next year on in the Laboratory for Blood Coagulation under the direction of Marc Verstraete. Under the guidance of young gastroenterologist Guido Tytgat and biochemist René De Vreker he studied the rate at which the coagulation proteins fibrinogen and plasminogen are cleared from the circulation. This early experience with biochemical lab work inspired Désiré Collen to become a researcher rather than a practicing general physician or medical specialist. Realising his knowledge in chemistry was inadequate, he combined his education in medicine with academic studies in chemistry. He graduated from the KU Leuven as Doctor in Medicine in 1968 and as Master ("Licentiaat") in Chemistry in 1969.

Mid 1968 Désiré Collen became research assistant of the Belgian National Fund for Scientific Research in the Laboratory of Marc Verstraete. He worked simultaneously in the Department of Physical Chemistry under the supervision of Leo C.M. De Maeyer. He started a research project on factors influencing the polymerization of fibrinogen to fibrin. Only months later, he published his first, although a very short one, scientific paper in Nature.

In 1971–1972 he went as an Associate Research Scientist of the National Institutes of Health (United States) to the New York University Medical Center to work with Alan Johnson. In 1972–1973 he worked in the laboratory of Birger Blombäck at Karolinska Institutet in Stockholm (Sweden) as a NATO Research Fellow. After obtaining his PhD in Chemistry at the KU Leuven in 1974 and concluding his mandatory military service, Désiré Collen was appointed in 1976 as Lecturer (Docent) in the Faculty of Medicine at KU Leuven and as Adjunct Head of Clinic in the Section Bleeding and Vascular Diseases in the Department of Internal Medicine at the University Hospital Leuven.

Career and research

Research output
The scientific output of Désiré Collen between 1968 and 2011 consists of 667 peer-reviewed research papers in international journals, 172 review articles and 39 issued US patents. His publications have been cited over 70,000 times in the scientific literature. He made seminal contributions to the fields of thrombosis, haemostasis and vascular biology. His pivotal achievement has been the development of tissue-type plasminogen activator (t-PA) from a laboratory concept to the first life saving biotech drug. Recombinant t-PA has been primarily used for dissolving blood clots causing acute myocardial infarction or acute ischemic stroke.

The cloning of t-PA and preclinical research
T-PA is a protease that converts inactive plasminogen into active plasmin, which in turn cleaves fibrin, the main component of blood clots. Upon cleavage of the long fibrin strands by plasmin, the clot falls apart and dissolves. Between August 1977 and September 1978 Désiré Collen and Bjorn Wiman elucidated that the conversion of plasminogen to plasmin takes place when both proteins are bound to fibrin in the blood clot. This molecular model for the regulation and control of fibrinolysis was presented in 1979 during an invited plenary lecture (Edward Kowalski Memorial Lecture) at the VIIth International Congress on Thrombosis and Haemostasis in London.  The written report of this presentation has been cited over 1200 times in the scientific literature.

Collen collaborated in the same period with Professor Alfons Billiau of the Rega Institute for Medical Research in Leuven, Belgium, on the inhibition of plasminogen activators secreted by malignant cells in culture, hypothesizing that synthetic inhibitors might suppress the malignant phenotype of these cells. In order to have a source for these "malignant plasminogen activators" the Bowes Melanoma Cell line was obtained from Professor Daniel Rifkin of the Rockefeller University, New York City at the end of 1978. It quickly appeared that this cell line produced large amounts of a plasminogen activator with a molecular weight of 70,000 dalton and a high affinity for fibrin, characteristic of human tissue-type plasminogen activator (t-PA), whereas most other malignant cells produced a plasminogen activator with a molecular weight of 54,000 dalton without affinity for fibrin, which is characteristic of pro-urokinase. This game-changing, although trivial serendipitous observation, made on 9 February 1979, was to change the course of thrombolytic therapy.

In order to produce sufficient amounts of t-PA for further biochemical and preclinical studies, post-doctoral fellow Dingeman (Dick) Rijken succeeded in isolating sufficient amounts of pure and homogeneous t-PA from conditioned culture medium from the Bowes Melanoma Cell line. This purified protein was used by post-doctoral fellow Osamu Matsuo to evaluate the thrombolytic potential of t-PA in rabbits suffering from an experimental pulmonary embolus. The research led to a key patent (US4752603) entitled 'Plasminogen activator and pharmaceutical composition having thrombolytic activity' which was first submitted in the Netherlands on 11 June 1980.

On 12 June 1980, one day after the submission of the patent application, Collen presented the results at the Fifth Congress on Fibrinolysis in Malmö (Sweden) in the presence of Diane Pennica, a young scientist from biotech company Genentech Inc, based in South San Francisco. Collen, KU Leuven and Genentech agreed to collaborate on the production of a recombinant version of t-PA (rt-PA), embarking on a new model for drug development: academic and biotech collaboration, today routine, but at that time a new modus operandi. Within 18 months, Pennica and her team had cloned the cDNA (complementary DNA) of human t-PA messenger RNA and was producing rt-PA in cultures of Chinese hamster ovary cells.

The therapeutic potential of rt-PA and its functional identity with natural t-PA was proven in a collaboration with Steven R. Bergman and Burton Sobel (Washington University School of Medicine, Saint Louis), Frans Van de Werf (KU Leuven), and Herman 'Chip' Gold and Tsunehori Yasuda (Massachusetts General Hospital, Harvard Medical School, Boston) using canine models of coronary thrombosis.

Clinical studies with t-PA

Also in 1981, following a discussion with Alfons Billiau at a scientific congress in Amsterdam, Dutch nephrologist Willem Weimar of the Dijkzigt Hospital in Rotterdam treated for the first time a patient with t-PA purified from the Bowes Melanoma Cell line. The patient, a 29-year-old lady, was suffering from a renal transplant vein thrombosis and was successfully treated resulting in a decennia-long survival. Cardiologists Frans Van de Werf and Burton Sobel tested t-PA in 1983 in a pilot clinical study on patients with acute myocardial infarction. Also in 1983, the first prospective, randomized and placebo-controlled trial of recombinant t-PA took place in three US hospitals.

The subsequent NIH Thrombolysis in Acute Myocardial Infarction (TIMI) trials led by Eugene Braunwald (Brigham and Women’s Hospital, Harvard School of Medicine, Boston), and the European Cooperative Study Group Trials led by Marc Verstraete (KU Leuven) culminated in the final approval of rt-PA as thrombolytic agent by the FDA on 13 November 1987. Genentech immediately started to market the drug in the US under the brand name Activase®, while Boehringer Ingelheim would distribute the drug in the rest of the world (except Japan) as Actilyse®.

A lifesaving drug
The controversy over whether the more expensive rt-PA was clinically superior over streptokinase as a thrombolytic agent climaxed in the scientific press between 1988 and 1992. To end this controversy, the GUSTO trial (Global Utilization of Streptokinase and t-PA for Occluded Coronary Arteries) was set up, a head-to-head comparison between rt-PA and streptokinase. In the GUSTO-trial 41,021 heart attack patients were treated in 1,081 hospitals in 15 countries. Cardiologist Eric Topol of the Cleveland Clinic (USA), cardiologist/statistician Robert Califf of Duke University Medical Center (USA) and David Stump of Genentech coordinated the trial. In absolute figures the 30-day mortality rate in the rt-PA group was 1% lower (or in relative figures 14%) compared to the mortality in the streptokinase group. After the GUSTO studies, rt-PA became the thrombolytic drug of choice for most of the cardiologists in the Western world and would save the lives of many tens of thousands of heart attack patients.

Nowadays, cardiologists agree that timely performed percutaneous coronary intervention (PCI), also known as 'angioplasty’ and ‘stenting', is the preferred strategy to treat acute myocardial infarction instead of thrombolysis. PCI is associated with less mortality on the short term (7% versus 9% for thrombolysis), a lower risk of a recurrent infarct (3% versus 7%) and a lower frequency of cerebral hemorrhage (1% versus 2%). Also over a longer period of time, PCI leads to a lower mortality rate.

However, because access to invasive facilities is limited in many countries, thrombolytic therapy is still employed in many centers worldwide for treating acute myocardial infarction. Moreover, rt-PA based thrombolysis still is an important strategy to treat ischemic stroke and to a lesser extent, pulmonary embolism and deep vein thrombosis; it has even been used to restore the blood flow in occluded central venous access ports and in the frozen limbs of mountaineers, resulting in a spectacular decrease in the amputation rate.

Staphylokinase – poor man's t-PA
On many occasions Désiré Collen expressed his frustration that the lives of many more people could have been saved, had rt-PA been more readily available, also to people who were not living in the affluent western world. Therefore, he invested part of Genentech's t-PA royalty stream in the search for a "t-PA for the poor".

In the early 1990s, together with Roger Lijnen (KU Leuven) and Osamu Matsuo (Kindai University, Osaka, Japan), Collen started to evaluate whether staphylokinase (STAR), a bacterial profibrinolytic agent with high fibrin specificity, could be a valid alternative for rt-PA in less wealthy territories. By setting up spin off company Thromb-X, Collen had the clear objective to further develop staphylokinase through the preclinical and clinical research phases up to the market introduction. Although wild type staphylokinase and variants with reduced immunogenicity and preserved lytic potency have been tested with success in humans, its further development came to an unfortunate standstill because of the prohibitive expense of a GUSTO-like clinical trial with a mortality end-point that had become the standard in the West. Not even licensing out the further clinical development, production and commercialization of staphylokinase to companies in developing countries (where for most people rt-PA is hardly available) could save this project.

VIB Department for Transgene Technology and Gene Therapy
With the constitution of the Flemish Institute for Biotechnology (Vlaams Instituut voor Biotechnologie – VIB), Collen was able to extend the capacity of his Leuven-based academic research laboratories. He became Director of the VIB Department for Transgene Technology and Gene Therapy (now VIB-KU Leuven Center for Cancer Biology) based on the Gasthuisberg Campus of the KU Leuven. Together with Professor Peter Carmeliet and colleagues, landmark contributions were made to the fields of vascular biology, tumor biology and neurobiology, e.g. between 1995 and 2008 the Department conducted breakthrough research on the role of vascular endothelial growth factor (VEGF) and placental growth factor (PlGF) in angiogenesis, cancer, and amyotrophic lateral sclerosis (ALS).

Academic Appointments
From 1981 to 2008 Désiré Collen was Professor at the Faculty of Medicine of the KU Leuven in Belgium. Between 1998 and 2002 he temporarily resigned to develop ThromboGenics, but remained 'Extraordinary Professor' (Buitengewoon hoogleraar). In 2008 he reached the age of mandatory retirement at Belgian Universities.

Désiré Collen was also Professor of Biochemistry and Medicine in the Department of Kenneth G. Mann at the University of Vermont College of Medicine, Burlington, Vermont, USA (1984–2005), Visiting Professor of Medicine in the group of Herman 'Chip' Gold of Massachusetts General Hospital at Harvard School of Medicine, Boston, MA, USA (1987–1994), Consultant in Medicine at the Massachusetts General Hospital, Boston, MA, USA (1987–2005) and Visiting Professor at the Division of Surgery and Anaesthesia of Kevin Burnand at United Medical and Dental Schools of Guy's and St Thomas' Hospitals, London, UK (1999–2002).

Désiré Collen was Director of the Center for Molecular and Vascular Biology at the Faculty of Medicine of the KU Leuven from 1994 to 2008, Division Head of the Protein Research Division of Leuven Research and Development vzw of the KU Leuven from 1976 to 1998 and Director of the Department for Transgene Technology and Gene Therapy of the Vlaams Instituut voor Biotechnologie (VIB) from 1994 to 2008.

D. Collen Research Foundation
On 2 July 1988 the D. Collen Research Foundation was constituted by Désiré Collen, Roger Dillemans Roger Dillemans, Rector of the KU Leuven, Karel Tavernier, General Manager of the KU Leuven, Jacques Vander Eecken, Chairman of Leuven Research and Development and Lawrence Fouraker, former Dean of the Harvard Business School representing the Harvard Medical School. The mission of the Foundation was to canalize the major part of the income from the rt-PA royalties towards "the execution, promotion and support of scientific research in general, and biomedical and biotechnological research in particular, by making available research grants, research positions, travel bursaries, by organizing scientific congresses and symposia, providing financial support for publications and all related activities that support the advancement of science." With the support of the Foundation, over 100 young researchers were able to obtain further specialisation abroad; numerous congresses and symposia and two academic chairs were sponsored, the 9th floor of the research building on the Gasthuisberg Research Campus and a guesthouse on the Groot Begijnhof campus were built with financial support of the Foundation. These buildings housed for many years the Center for Thrombosis and Vascular Research and the VIB Department for Transgene Technology and Gene Therapy and their postdoctoral researchers, respectively.

In 2007 the D. Collen Research Foundation was renamed to Life Sciences Research Partners vzw. It continued the activities of the D. Collen Research Foundation, but also started to invest in life science companies, such as Celyad, Ogeda, Amakem, Bone Therapeutics and others.

Thromb-X and ThromboGenics
In 1991, Désiré Collen spun out Thromb-X nv from the KU Leuven with an initial mission to develop staphylokinase as an equally effective but less expensive successor of rt-PA. With the foundation of ThromboGenics Ltd in Ireland in 1998, the Company expanded its R&D scope to include various cardiovascular, oncology and ophthalmology programs in-licensed from the KU Leuven and the Vlaams Instituut voor Biotechnologie (Flemish Institute for Biotechnologie – VIB). Collen was CEO and Chairman of ThromboGenics from 1998 to 2008. In 2008 Patrick De Haes succeeded him as CEO.

Following a successful IPO in 2006 on the basis of the expanded R&D portfolio, the company nevertheless narrowed its scope to the clinical development of ocriplasmin, a truncated form of plasmin for ophthalmology indications, culminating in the completion of a pivotal phase III program in 2010. Following FDA approval, ThromboGenics launched ocriplasmin, marketed as Jetrea®, in the US on 14 January 2013 for the treatment of symptomatic vitreomacular adhesion (VMA). Three months later, the European Commission approved ocriplasmin, a decision that paved the way for Alcon to launch the product under licence of ThromboGenics. Disappointed by the, in his opinion, inadequate strategic and commercial governance of the company, Collen stepped down as Chairman and member of the board in December 2013.

Fund+
In May 2015 Désiré Collen, through the private foundation Désiré Collen Stichting and the non-profit organisation Life Sciences Research Partners, founded Fund+ of which he was Chairman until 2019 and is the Honorary Chairman since 2019. Fund+ will invest in innovative life sciences companies seeking series A or B financing and with a Proof of Concept in therapeutics, diagnostics or medical devices. Fund+ aims at realizing an attractive financial return for its investors, as well as a societal return. Fund+ wants to contribute in a sustainable way to the improvement of the eco system for biotech companies. Therefore, its major geographical focus will be Belgium. Fund+ had raised over 200 Million euro of financing commitments. The intended investment size per company will be between 5 and 15 million euro spread over different milestones.

Awards and honours
Désiré Collen was awarded the Belgian Francqui Prize in Biological and Medical Sciences in 1984. He received the Louis-Jeantet Prize for Medicine (Fondation L. Jeantet, Geneva, Switzerland) in 1986, the Bristol-Myers Squibb Award for Cardiovascular Research (New York, NY, USA) jointly with Mark Verstraete in 1994, the Interbrew-Baillet Latour Health Prize (Belgium) jointly with Peter Carmeliet in 2005, the Harvard Leadership Prize by the Harvard Club of Belgium in 2007, the Insead Innovator Prize in 2009, the Robert P. Grant Medal from the International Society for Thrombosis and Haemostasis in 2011, the Lifetime Achievement Award of Belcham (New York, NY, USA) in 2013 and the Lifetime Achievement Award of Scrip (London, UK) in 2013.

He became Ereburger (Honorary Citizen) of his native town Sint-Truiden (Belgium) in 2013 and Alumnus of the Year 2014 of Alfagen KU Leuven. In 2013 his majesty King Albert II of Belgium awarded him the hereditary nobility status (personal title of Baron).

In addition he received honorary doctorates from Erasmus University, Rotterdam (The Netherlands) in 1988, Free University of Brussels (VUB), Brussels (Belgium) in 1994, University of Notre Dame, Notre Dame (IN, USA) in 1995 and Université de la Méditerranée, Marseille (France) in 1999.

Books
Collen's memoires (in Dutch) 'Een hart voor onderzoek en ondernemen' were published in 2009 by VandenBroele. Désiré Collen, biotechpionier (in Dutch) was published in 2018 by LannooCampus.

References

External links
  

Belgian medical researchers
People from Sint-Truiden
1943 births
Living people
KU Leuven alumni
Academic staff of KU Leuven